On 6 February 2011, Jhala Nath Khanal of the Communist Party of Nepal (UML) was elected the new Prime Minister of Nepal, after his predecessor Madhav Kumar Nepal resigned as the head of the government seven months before in June 2010. While many Nepalese thought that this would bring stability to the country, differences with the coalition partner, the Unified Communist Party of Nepal (Maoist) led to only three ministers being sworn in along the Prime Minister on 6 February 2011.

On 4 May 2011, the two main coalition parties came to an agreement to form the final council of ministers. As per demand of the Unified Communist Party of Nepal (Maoist), the party received the portfolio of the Home Ministry, which the opposition party Nepali Congress saw critically, as this would make them oversee the police of Nepal that had been the worst victims of Maoist attacks during the Nepalese Civil War.

Ministers

References 

Government of Nepal
Cabinet of Nepal
2011 in Nepal
2011 establishments in Nepal
2011 disestablishments in Nepal